Linby railway station was a station on what is now the Robin Hood Line. It was used predominantly to serve Linby Colliery. It shut in 1964. When the line was re-opened in the 1990s it was decided not to re-open Linby station, or the nearby Annesley railway station.

References

Disused railway stations in Nottinghamshire
Former Midland Railway stations
Railway stations in Great Britain opened in 1882
Railway stations in Great Britain closed in 1964
Beeching closures in England